Stefka Mikhaylova Madina (born 23 January 1963) is a Bulgarian rower. She was a bronze medal with her partner Violeta Ninova in Double sculls at the 1988 Seoul Olympic Games. Madina was born in Plovdiv.

References

External links
 

1963 births
Living people
Bulgarian female rowers
Olympic rowers of Bulgaria
Olympic bronze medalists for Bulgaria
Olympic medalists in rowing
Rowers at the 1988 Summer Olympics
Medalists at the 1988 Summer Olympics
World Rowing Championships medalists for Bulgaria